Neravai is a village in Druskininkai municipality, in Alytus County, in south Lithuania. It is de facto a suburb of Druskininkai city.

References

Villages in Alytus County
Druskininkai Municipality